Gardy Girault, stylized as G∆rdy Gir∆ult, is a Haitian electronic musician, DJ, remixer and record producer. He is a pioneer of an electronic music subgenre called rara tech that fuses the Afro-Haitian genre rara with house music.
Gardy Girault, is a rare breed in his genre of music. Driven by his passion of electronic music alive, he integrates ancestral elements native to his land, creating a unique yet contemporary musical experience.

Early life
Girault was born in Port-au-Prince, Haiti.

Career
His album Kiskeya was released in 2015.

References

External links
Gardy Girault on Facebook
Gardy Girault on Twitter
Gardy Girault on SoundCloud
Gardy Girault on YouTube
Gardy Girault on Instagram

Living people
Year of birth missing (living people)
21st-century Haitian musicians
People from Port-au-Prince
Haitian record producers
Remixers
Haitian DJs